Forever Quebec is a Canadian documentary film, directed by Jean-Claude Labrecque and released in 2008. The film is a portrait of life in Quebec City, made as part of the city's 400th anniversary celebrations that year.

The film had originally been planned for 75 minutes in length and commercial distribution, but Labrecque had to revise his plans following the financial difficulties facing Christal Films. It received a theatrical screening at the city's Agora du Vieux-Port as part of the National Film Board of Canada's free screening series of documentary films about the city on July 2 and 3, but was otherwise distributed primarily through television broadcast on Télévision de Radio-Canada and ARTV.

The film received a Genie Award nomination for Best Documentary at the 29th Genie Awards in 2009.

References

External links

2008 films
2008 documentary films
Canadian documentary films
Films directed by Jean-Claude Labrecque
Documentary films about Quebec
National Film Board of Canada documentaries
French-language Canadian films
2000s Canadian films